Aam Aadmi Party (AAP) is a political party in India, founded in November 2012 by Arvind Kejriwal and his companions. It is currently the ruling party of two governments: Delhi, the capital territory of India, and the state of Punjab. The Rajya Sabha members are elected for a six year term.

References

External links

Aam